The Kicks of Passion is the debut studio album from the pop punk band, Powerspace. It was released by Fueled By Ramen Records on July 31, 2007.

Track listing
 "Prologue: Adam Beckett" - 3:35
 "Quarantine My Heart (Baby)" - 3:37
 "Powerspace Snap Bracelet" - 2:35
 "Right On, Right Now" - 3:40
 "Amplifire" - 4:23
 "Be Aggressive" - 2:49
 "This Is Not What You Had Planned" - 3:13
 "Dancing in the Future" - 3:02
 "Choose Your Own Adventure" - 3:51
 "It Smells Like Electricity in Here" - 2:43
 "I Met My Best Friend in Prague" - 3:27
 "Sleep, Everyone..." - 3:41

iTunes bonus tracks
 "Stoned In Love" - 3:36
 "All Out, All Night" - 3:14
 "You Vs. Me Round III" [Demo] - 3:30

Trivia
The songs "Prologue: Adam Beckett", "Powerspace Snap Bracelet", "Right On, Right Now", and "It Smells Like Electricity In Here" were all featured on the Houston, We Have A Party EP.
The song "I Met My Best Friend In Prague" is the album version of the Houston, We Have A Party EP song, "I Put The 'Abs' In Abstinence."

References

External links
 Fueled By Ramen Album Page
 Official Band Website
 Official Band MySpace

2007 debut albums
Powerspace albums
Fueled by Ramen albums